Nelson L. Hardwick (born September 19, 1951) is an American politician. From 2005 through 2015, he served as a member of the South Carolina House of Representatives from the 106th District. He is a member of the Republican party.

Hardwick resigned from his seat on May 13, 2015.

References

Living people
1951 births
Republican Party members of the South Carolina House of Representatives